Capidava (Kapidaua, Cappidava, Capidapa, Calidava, Calidaua) was an important Geto-Dacian center on the right bank of the Danube. After the Roman conquest, it became a civil and military center, as part of the province of Moesia Inferior (later Scythia Minor), modern Dobruja.

It is located in the village with the same name, Capidava, in Constanța County, Romania.

Ancient sources

Tabula Peutingeriana 
Capidava is depicted in the form Calidava/Calidaua in Segmentum VIII of Tabula Peutingeriana (1st–4th century) on a Roman road between Axiopolis and Carsium. The map provides accurate data on the distances between Axiopolis, Capidava and Carsium. These distances coincide with the distances between the present localities of Hinog - Capidava and Capidava - Hârşova. This is also verified by the discovery of a milestone at Seimenii Mici that indicates the distance of 18,000 feet (27 km) from Axiopolis to Capidava.

Notitia Dignitatum 
Capidava appears on an illustration from Notitia Dignitatum imperii romani (Basel ?, cca. 1436) between the fortresses standing on the Lower Danube limes and found under the authority of the military commander of the province (dux Scythiae). Notitia also mentions at Capidava (form Capidaua) a cavalry unit or detachment of units under the command of the Duke of Scythia: Cuneus equitum Solensium, Capidaua. The Cuneus equitum Solensium might well be the cavalry component of the old Legio XX Valeria Victrix, renamed the Solenses.

Etymology 

Capidava took its name from the old Getic dava "settlement" that was in a close area. Capidava name has the characteristic Dacian ending, the suffix –dava meaning "settlement, village, town". This Getic toponym, means the "curve fortified settlement". The Getic name had been preserved by the Romans under the form Capidava in the Antonine Itinerary (224, 3) Calidava in the Tabula Peutingeriana (VIII, 3) and Cappidava or Capidapa in the Geography of Ravenna (179, 3 and 186). The entire territory took the name "territorium capidavense". Petculescu noted that, in the zone of the Danubian frontier zone, the names of the sites of the forts and the civilian settlements related to them were overwhelmingly of pre-Roman origin, mostly Geto-Dacian. In the southern part of the frontier, there was a concentration of names ending in dava, characteristic of the Geto-Dacian hill-forts, indicating that the Roman army on this arrival in this zone of the Danubian frontier found a lot of local tribes dwelling in fortified sites according to their traditions habits. Nevertheless, Capidava is one of the few Roman-era settlements with indigenous names in the area were no significant pre-Roman settlement was found. According to Irimia, this is at great extent because of insufficient research.

History

Dacian town  

Based on the literary evidences that confirms both the existence and the importance of Capidava and also based on the archaeological pre-Roman evidences, some take into consideration the hypothesis that the Getic fortress might have been razed to the ground through the building of the Roman castra itself

Historians such as Suceveanu, Miclea and Florescu consider that the pre-Roman indigenous Getic settlement of Capidava, located at some distance from the future Roman fortress gave the name Capidava. On the site of modern Capidava village, there is a La Tène settlement of Geto-Dacian culture, dated to 5th century - 2nd century BC. At 4 km south of Capidava, on the bank of Zaval Valley, there are strong Geto-Dacian traces, dating back to the second period of Iron Age. Beside the Geto-Dacian ceramic, fragments of Roman vases are scattered here and there.

The early 20th century Romanian archaeologist and historian Vasile Pârvan identified the Geto-Dacian Capidava as the center of power for the Getic king Dapyx, within a territorium Capidavense. Cassius Dio's Historia Romana makes mention of the retreat of Dapyx into his fort after his defeat in 28 BC at the hand of Marcus Licinius Crassus. Pârvan identified the fort mentioned by Dio with future Roman fort Capidava, stating the locations described in the ancient source fit well with the modern location.

Pârvan identified the administrative form of Capidava as an old Dacian pagus, based on a local inscription.

Following Pârvan's research and view, many historians supposed a pre-Roman dwelling in the area of the Roman fort. The geographic position would have explained the significance of the local settlement, a place that made possible the communication between the Dacians in Dobruja and those in the Wallachian Plain. However, as of the 2000s (decade), the Getic fort was not archaeologically identified. Moreover, in the cemetery excavated at Capidava only graves of specific Roman provincial type were found.

The archaeological material of the 2nd century AD is mixed in character: Geto-Dacian and Roman. The funeral stone of the Cocceius family from Capidava, dated Roman epoch, has a relief of the Thracian rider. Representation of the ox drawn plow of Getians had been preserved on the so-called "Quadratus grave" discovered at Capidava.

Roman times 

The Roman Empire had reached the Danube as early as 14 AD, when the commander Aelius Catus conducted an expedition beyond the river in order to keep away the restless Dacians and their new allies, the Sarmatians. But the legions deployed their troops only up to Durostorum, as modern northern Dobruja was left to the forces of the kings of the Sapaei, the allies of the Romans, helped by the forces commanded by a Praefectus orae maritimae (commander of the seashore). In 46 AD, when the Kingdom of the Sapaei ceased to exist, it is likely that small Roman garrisons stationed in the old Dacian settlements on the bank of the Danube, including in Capidava. Only later Emperor Domitian would realize the strategic importance of the land between the Danube and the Black Sea, as he used Scythia Minor as a starting point of his expeditions over the Danube, against the Dacians. The changing fate of these expeditions, the chaotic effect of two successive defeats hindered a systematic effort for strengthening and garrisoning the bank of the Danube.

Emperor Trajan, as part of his preparations for the Daco-Roman wars has built, with detachments of the Legio V Macedonica of Troesmis and Legio XI Claudia of Durostorum, a castellum on the cliff at Capidava which had to control the ford and he deploy a garrison probably made up of Cohors I Ubiorum. The location of Capidava is securely verified based firstly on an inscription mentioning a vexillatio Capidabesium and on the measurements made on the ground, following the distance indicated in the Tabula Peutingeriana.

The initially indigenous center Capidava developed due to the presence of the Roman army. After the Roman conquest of Dacia, the strategic importance of Capidava determined the Romans to establish a military station as well as to settle and develop a civil center, as part of the province of Moesia Inferior (later Scythia Minor). The settlement used to be considered a pagus, however more recent research suggest it was probably a vicus, if Veturius Tertius who put an altar at Galbiori as magister vici is the same with C. Veturius Tertius known from a funerary inscription discovered at Capidava Nonetheless, Pârvan admitted a "vicus canabarum" beside the old "Dacian" pagus of Capidava.

At the time of Hadrian and even earlier at the time of Trajan, Roman farmers already dwelt in isolated settlements, in the so-called Roman villa and vicus.  Separated from them, South Thracian colonists, Bessians, inhabited also isolated villages.  The population of its district (pagus) consisted of Dacians and Bessi and of Roman citizens (CIL., iii, 14214, 26). According to Pârvan, by 130-150 AD Capidava was already Romanized. Roman veterans settled in the canabae (civilian settlement attached to military base) or maybe also in the old Getic village that was not far away. Inscriptions with Dacian names like Tsinna (Zinnas, Sinna) and Tsiru dating to 2nd century have been discovered at the site: "Tsiru son of Bassus in ISM V 27".

It seems that the fort at Capidava was only a chain in a system comprising many others including the fortifications at Carsium, Cius, Troesmis, Noviodunum, Aegyssus. The fort was also provided with a port facility, including a wharf below the water, and storage and other annexes on the upper terrace, as well as with an edifice of thermae (public bath houses) outside the precinct walls, to the south-east. This dock was in fact the main endowment of a station of the fleet Classis Flavia Moesica whose main base had been established at Noviodunum. To the E and NE of the fortified settlement stretched the tumulus cemetery with incineration graves, with rich inventories, and further to the south, a plane cemetery, with more modestly furnished graves. It is not clearly known to what extent the fort at Capidava played a role in the Moesian episode from the autumn of the first year of the Dacian war (101 AD) when also the great Battle of Adamclisi took place.

The fortification is square-shaped with NW-SE sides, a size of 105 x 127 m2 (1,33 ha) with walls over 2 m thick and 5–6 m high. It had 7 towers over 10 m, 3 of which are rectangular, 2 shaped as a quarter of a circle and 2 intermediate towers in the shape of a horseshoe (U). The fort also had a gate 2.50 m wide on the SE side that was the link to the rest of the territory, and a strategic outlet on the SW side of the tower towards the Danube, where the port used to be.

The fort continued to function as a guard of the river and ford, seemingly without many problems, except for the change in the garrison troops, after 243 AD when Cohors I Ubiorum was replaced by Cohors I Germanorum civium romanorum until the end of the 3rd century.

The fortified settlement played an important role in the Roman defensive system belonging to the series of camps and fortifications raised during the reign of Emperor Trajan, in the early 2nd century, as part of the measures to organize the Danubian limes. Capidava being part of the Limes Moesiae, was connected by roads to Carsium, Ulmetum, the castra from Basarabi-Murfatlar and castra from Cernavodă.

The place is very suitable for this kind of construction providing a large surveillance area: a massive rock standing between the foot of the slope going down from the NE and the Danube. The massif had a strategic advantage, namely a natural moat starting from the Danube, turning around it on the NE side, almost up to the east corner of the fortified settlement. Moreover, the shape of the massif entailed the shape and orientation of the camp.

The following Roman legions and cohors have been stationed at the Capidava legionary castra:
 Legio XI Claudia
 Legio I Italica
 Legio II Herculia
 Cohors I Germanorum
 Cohors I Ubiorum

Destroyed by Goths in the 3rd century, the fortifications were rebuilt in the next century, then it became an episcopal center.

Sources between the 4th to 6th centuries talk about cavalry units, Cuneus equitum Solensium, and also equites scutarii and vexillatio Capidavensium.

The fort was abandoned in 559 after the invasion of the Avars/Kutrigurs under Zabergan's command.

Byzantine times 

After the official withdrawal from Dobrudja of the Eastern Roman Empire (ca. 600), the city was rebuilt by the Byzantines in the 10th century, also hosting the local population.

Fire caused by the Pechenegs in 1036 led to its final abandonment.

In the spring of 1036, an invasion of the Pechenegs devastated large parts of the region, destroying the forts at Capidava and Dervent and burning the settlement in Dinogeţia. In 1046 the Byzantines accepted the settling of Pechenegs under Kegen in Paristrion as foederati. They established some form of domination until 1059, when Isaac I Komnenos reconquered Dobruja.

Archaeology 

The ruins at Capidava were known by word of mouth from long ago, as the Turkish village (a military colony) founded in the 18th century under the name of Kale-koy, that is "the village of the fortified settlement". The first scientific explorers of the Dobruja's land, from the end of the 19th century and the beginning of the 20th century were captain Mihai Ionescu-Dobrogeanu and archaeologist Grigore Tocilescu who mentioned the fortification and gathered antiquities from its area.

In an archaeological survey conducted before World War I, Vasile Pârvan identified it and asked Pamfil Polonic Sr. to create a concise plan of the ruins. Right after the war, Pârvan intended to undertake a vast project of archaeological research in Dobrudja likely to be joined by all his pupils in Bucharest and Iaşi. Starting from 1924 and continuing in 1926 and 1927 they initiated here archaeological excavations, led by one of Vasile Parvan's assistants, Grigore Florescu, later a lecturer in epigraphy and antiquities with the Faculty of Letters of the University of Bucharest. Grigore Florescu led the researches at Capidava until 1960, when he died on the archaeological site of Drobeta. Until 1954 he worked alone, helped from time to time by his students. Between 1949 and 1954, the excavations at Capidava as well as other field research on the Roman period were interrupted.

The most important monuments uncovered at Capidava include epigraphical and sculptural ones, and also pottery: vessels, amphorae, clay buckets, jars, bowls, lamps. At the same time, they uncovered metal, bone, glass, stone, earth artifacts and coins. The coins date from the time of John I Tzimiskes, Basil II, Constantine VIII, and Theodora. Of the total of almost 50 epigraphic monuments uncovered 25 are funerary steles, and the rest are altars, honorary or simple votives. The sculptural monuments uncovered number 15 and are capitals, a hand, a shaft-column, a leg, a serpent, an eagle.

In 1969, in the ancient Geto-Dacian settlement of Capidava that subsequently become a Roman fortress, it was discovered a pitcher (of local make, in the Roman-Byzantine tradition) which – beside the sign of the cross and the Greek alphabet – carries the name Petre (a common name in the Danube valley, interpreted as Romanian by some Romanian historians).

Tourism 

Capidava fortified settlement is a tourist attraction in Dobruja area, next to Hârşova and Histria. It can be reached through the road from Hârşova (E61), or the road from Cernavodă (Feteşti-Cernavodă).

Visitors can see the impressive precinct wall, the fortified settlement gate with a tower, the trajectory of the tower foundations in the shape of horseshoes. In the south part of the fortified settlement along 1/3 of its length one can see the foundation of the defensive wall and late fort, as well as the trajectory of the ditch protecting it. In this sector it was uncovered the building of the guards. Inside the fortified settlement one can look at several buildings raised around a private square, fitted with porches, as well as access paths and sewerage canals. Out of 8 dolia (doliare opus) - a general term for rough pottery artifacts, brick ones, tile ones, sewerage pipes - 3 were left.

The Stone Ring Island

Next to Capidava on the Danube there’s an island that only comes to surface for a few summer months when the Danube river dries. The 2 kilometers wide island is not present on any map, therefore this interesting phenomenon attracted science fiction fans who started organizing every year an ecological summer camp: the Atlantykron Summer academy gathers people who are passionate about astronomy and science fiction.

Gallery

See also 
 Dacia
 List of ancient towns in Scythia Minor
 List of ancient cities in Thrace and Dacia
 List of castra
 Dacian davae

Notes

References

Ancient

Modern

Further reading 

 
 
 
 
 Early Byzantine Capidava
 Official Capidava Fortress Site at Constanța County Council
 Capidava at Encyclopedia Dacica
 Capidava at Turism Constanța - hosted by the Public Office for Tourism, Commerce and Public Services, part of the Constanța County Council
 Capidava - hosted by the Romanian National Institute of Historical Monuments
 Capidava article at ziare.com
 Cetatea Capidava (Dobrogea)

External links 

 Official Capidava Archaeological Site(In Romanian)
 Official Capidava Fortress Site at Constanța County Council
 Capidava at Encyclopedia Dacica
 Capidava at Turism Constanţa - hosted by the Public Office for Tourism, Commerce and Public Services, part of the Constanţa County Council
 Capidava - hosted by the Romanian National Institute of Historical Monuments
 Capidava article at ziare.com
 Capidava Illustrations and Images at cIMeC

Dacian towns
Archaeological sites in Romania
Ruins in Romania
Roman fortifications in Moesia Inferior